David Rendall (born 11 October 1948) is an English operatic tenor.

Personal life and education
Although he sang in a skiffle group while in secondary school, Rendall originally had no intention to sing opera professionally. He was "discovered" while working at the BBC, sorting records for Desert Island Discs. A producer for the show heard him singing "Questa o quella" from Rigoletto while working, and suggested he study professionally.

Rendall entered the Royal Academy of Music in 1970, and the Salzburg Mozarteum in 1973. He won a Young Musician of the Year Award from the Greater London Arts Association in 1973 and received a Gulbenkian Fellowship in 1975. In May 1978 he sang the tenor part of Anton Bruckner's Te Deum under the baton of Herbert von Karajan during a performance at Musikverein Hall of Vienna with Vienna Philharmonic.

Performing career
At Covent Garden, Rendall sang the roles of the Italian singer in Der Rosenkavalier, Almaviva in The Barber of Seville, Des Grieux in Manon, Matteo in Arabella, Rodrigo in La donna del lago, Flamand in Capriccio, and the Duke in Rigoletto. After making his Metropolitan Opera debut in 1980 as Ernesto in Don Pasquale, he returned as Don Ottavio in Don Giovanni, subsequently performing Lensky in Eugene Onegin, Matteo in Arabella, Ferrando in Cosi fan Tutte and the title role of Idomeneo.

He also performed with the English National Opera from 1976 to 1992, with the New York City Opera, San Francisco Opera, and many other opera companies in the United States, Great Britain, Ireland, France, Italy, Georgia, Japan, Denmark, and Germany.

Rendall was involved in a peculiar onstage incident in 1998 when he accidentally stabbed baritone Kimm Julian in the death scene of I Pagliacci during a rehearsal with the Florentine Opera. The switchblade-style knife that the Milwaukee opera company used failed to collapse, and the baritone received a  cut into his abdomen. Julian recovered and police cleared Rendall of any wrongdoing. He suffered injuries from a collapsing stage set during an April 2005 performance on stage in Copenhagen, and his career was subsequently curtailed. Rendall returned to performance in June 2013.

Rendall is married to the British lyric mezzo-soprano Diana Montague.  Their son is the baritone Huw Montague Rendall.

Recordings
Rendall's recordings include Berlioz, Requiem in 1979 conducted by Michael Gielen,  Maria Stuarda with Charles Mackerras and the English National Opera in 1982 and La rondine with Lorin Maazel and the London Symphony Orchestra in 1985.

See also
 Mozart: Così fan tutte (Alain Lombard recording)
 The Metropolitan Opera Centennial Gala, Deutsche Grammophon DVD, 00440-073-4538, 2009

References

1948 births
English operatic tenors
Living people
Alumni of the Royal Academy of Music
Mozarteum University Salzburg alumni
20th-century British male  opera singers
21st-century British opera singers
21st-century British male opera singers